No Limits: Live  is a live album from Gospel music singer Martha Munizzi. The album was released on March 4, 2006.

Track listing

Disc 1 

All songs written by Martha Munizzi, except where noted.
 "No Limits (Breakthrough)" (Greenley, Saunders, Thomas) - 05:00
 "Till The Walls Fall" (Munizzi, Reed) - 06:28
 "Till The Walls Fall (Reprise)" (Munizzi, Reed) - 02:20
 "Name Above All Names" - 06:30
 "Great Exchange (Prelude)" - 03:04
 "Great Exchange" - 06:03
 "Renew Me" - 08:25
 "Prophetic (Interlude)" - 02:25
 "Forever You're My King" (Mitchell) - 03:48
 "What He's Done" - 04:08
 "Amazing Love (P.D.)" (Campbell, Wesley) - 00:47
 "Amazing Love" (Kendrick) - 03:32

Disc 2 

All songs written by Martha Munizzi, except where noted.
 "Always Welcome" (Alessi, Cruse-Ratcliff) - 07:47
 "Holy Spirit Fill This Room" (Munizzi, Munizzi) - 02:51
 "Come Holy Spirit" (Alessi) - 03:21
 "He's Already Provided" - 08:10
 "I Believe God" (Hall, Munizzi) - 05:07
 "While You Worship (Chandler's Song)" - 06:15
 "You've Been So Good" (Munizzi, Reed) - 05:36 
 "You've Been So Good (Reprise)" (Munizzi, Reed) - 01:24
 "Jesus Is The Best Thing" (Chambers, Munizzi) - 08:03
 "Chosen Generation" - 04:59

Awards 

No Limits was nominated to a Dove Award for Contemporary Gospel Album of the Year at the 38th GMA Dove Awards.

Chart performance 

The album peaked at #60 on Billboard 200, #2 on Billboard's Christian Albums, and #1 on Billboard's Gospel Albums, where it stayed for 72 weeks. The song "No Limits (Breakthrough)" peaked at No. 27 on Billboard's Gospel Songs chart.

References

External links 
 No Limits at Amazon.com

2006 live albums
Martha Munizzi albums